William Henry Kent (March 21, 1823 – February 7, 1889) was a Massachusetts politician who served as a member of the Boston, Massachusetts, Board of Aldermen, the Charlestown, Massachusetts, Board of Aldermen, on the Charlestown, Massachusetts School Committee, and as the eleventh mayor of  Charlestown, Massachusetts.

Family life
Kent married Rebecca Prentiss of West Cambridge, (Arlington), Massachusetts, in that town on August 5, 1846, they had one child, a daughter, Alice Kent.

Notes

1823 births
1889 deaths
Mayors of Charlestown, Massachusetts
Massachusetts city council members
19th-century American politicians